Balco may refer to:

 Bay Area Laboratory Co-operative (BALCO), a controversial sports medicine/nutrition centre in Burlingame, California
 BALCO scandal
 Balco alloy, used as a probe in resistance temperature detectors
Bharat Aluminium Company, an Indian aluminium company